Acacesia is a genus of orb-weaver spiders first described by Eugène Simon in 1895. It contains six species with a mostly neotropical distribution, ranging from South America to Mexico. One species, A. hamata, is found in the US as well.

Description
The backs of spiders in this genus are marked with a dagger shape, outlined in black and surrounded by a triangular folium. On each side of the dagger there are parallel rows of orange-brown dots.

Behavior
As the other species are only known from museum specimens, only the natural history A. hamata is known in any detail.

Relationships
Ocrepeira and Cyclosa are close relatives of this genus.

Species
 it contains six species:
Acacesia benigna Glueck, 1994 – Peru, Bolivia, Brazil
Acacesia graciosa Lise & Braul, 1996 – Brazil
Acacesia hamata (Hentz, 1847) – USA to Argentina
Acacesia tenella (L. Koch, 1871) – Mexico to Brazil, French Guiana, Guyana
Acacesia villalobosi Glueck, 1994 – Brazil
Acacesia yacuiensis Glueck, 1994 – Brazil, Argentina

References

External links
 BugGuide: Photographs of A. hamata

Araneidae
Araneomorphae genera
Spiders of the United States
Spiders of Mexico
Spiders of South America
Taxa named by Eugène Simon